Vice Admiral Girish Luthra, PVSM, AVSM, VSM, ADC is a retired officer of Indian Navy who served as Flag Officer Commanding-in-Chief (FOC-in-C), Western Naval Command from 1 June 2016 to 30 January 2019. He took over the position from Admiral Sunil Lanba who was promoted to Chief of Naval Staff, and was succeeded by Vice Admiral Ajit Kumar.

Early life and education 
Luthra has attended the National Defence Academy, Pune; Defence Services Staff College, Wellington; and Naval War College, Newport.

Biography 
Luthra was commissioned into the executive branch of the Navy in July 1979. He has commanded three warships including, INS Khukri, INS Talwar and INS Viraat. He has also served as the Navigation officer of many warships including  INS Betwa, INS Gomati and INS Viraat. His staff appointments include Deputy Naval Attaché at High Commission of India, London; Fleet Navigating Officer of Western Fleet; Command Plans Officer at HQ, Eastern Naval Command; Principal Director Naval Plans; Assistant Chief of Naval Staff (Policy & Plans); Flag Officer Commanding Western Fleet; Director General of Naval Operations; and Deputy Chief of Integrated Defence Staff (Operations). He was the FOC-in-C of Southern Naval Command before being appointed as FOC-in-C of Western Naval Command.

During his career of almost four decades, he has been was awarded the Param Vishisht Seva Medal (2017), Ati Vishisht Seva Medal, and the Vishisht Seva Medal for his service.

Luthra is known to be a gifted singer as well. He rendered the new version of the famous song "Ghar Se Nikalte Hi" (original artist: Amaal Malik,Arman Malik), a remake of the same from film "Papa Kehte Hain" as originally crooned by Udit Narayan, live at Western Command Golden Jubilee ceremony, garnering many views on YouTube. He has also released videos on Youtube for songs, Soch Na Sake from Airlift (original artists: Arijit Singh and Tulsi Kumar) and Nazm Nazm (original artists: Arko/Ayushmann Khurrana).

Awards and decorations

References

Living people
Indian Navy admirals
Flag Officers Commanding Western Fleet
Recipients of the Param Vishisht Seva Medal
Recipients of the Vishisht Seva Medal
Recipients of the Ati Vishisht Seva Medal
Year of birth missing (living people)
Naval War College alumni